Lesley Hunt (born 29 May 1950) is a former tennis player from Perth, Western Australia.

Particularly noted as a junior player, in 1964 at the age of 14 she won a rare double in the Western Australian Women's open, taking both the Open and Junior titles. She won the Australian junior championship in 1967 and 1968 and reached the final of the Wimbledon Junior Invitational in 1968. That year she also won the French and United States Junior Championships. In 1968, she won the Australian and French Open Junior titles and the Australian Open Junior title again the following year.

In 1974 she was ranked number 3 in Australia. Between 1967 and 1979 she was never outside the top six in Australia, playing among contemporaries Margaret Court, Evonne Goolagong, Kerry Reid and Wendy Turnbull.

Hunt was seeded once in the United States championships (number 8 in 1974); twice at the French Championships (number 4 in 1976 and 7 in 1977; and once at the Australian Championships (number 5 in 1974). She was runner-up in the 1971 Virginia Slims tournament, losing to Margaret Court and in 1976 reached the final of the Italian Open. In 1978, she made her first international open victory with a win in the Swiss Open. She reached the finals of the Canadian and Italian Opens in the same year as well as the quarterfinals at the US Open.

As a doubles player, she won the U.S Open Hardcourt and Claycourt titles with Evonne Goolagong.

In December 1970, she joined with Court and Goolagong in the 1971 Federation Cup victory over Great Britain at Royal King's Park Tennis Club. In the final match, she partnered with Court, beating Virginia Wade and Winnie Shaw.

Hunt was inducted into the Western Australian Hall of Champions in 1993.

WTA Tour finals

Doubles 3 (1–2)

References

External links
 
 
 

1950 births
Living people
Australian female tennis players
Australian Open (tennis) junior champions
French Open junior champions
Sportswomen from Western Australia
Tennis players from Perth, Western Australia
Grand Slam (tennis) champions in girls' singles